Errol Bungey  (born 1931) is a former Australian international lawn bowler who played 68 times for his country.

Bowls career
Bungey won a silver medal in the fours with Robert King, Errol Stewart and Keith Poole at the 1974 British Commonwealth Games in Christchurch.

He was awarded the Order of Australia Medal in 1986 and was inducted into the South Australia Hall of Fame.

References

1931 births
Living people
Australian male bowls players
Commonwealth Games medallists in lawn bowls
Commonwealth Games silver medallists for Australia
Bowls players at the 1974 British Commonwealth Games
Recipients of the Medal of the Order of Australia
20th-century Australian people
Medallists at the 1974 British Commonwealth Games